A spearhead is the sharpened point (head) of a spear, similar to an arrowhead. It is often a separate piece called a projectile point.

Spearhead may also refer to:

Armed conflict 
 Armoured spearhead, a tactical formation
 HMS Spearhead (P263), an S class submarine of the Royal Navy
 Spearhead class Joint High Speed Vessel
 Spearhead, nickname of the 3rd Armored Division (United States) in the United States Army
 The Spearhead, nickname of the 5th Marine Division (United States) of the United States Marine Corps
 Spearhead, nickname of the 3rd Infantry Division (Philippines)
 Spearhead Ltd., an Israeli private mercenary company owned by Yair Klein

Film and television 
 Spearhead (TV series), a British television series
 Spearhead from Space, a 1970 serial in the British television series Doctor Who

Geography 
 The Spearhead, a peak in Whistler, British Columbia
 Spearhead Glacier, a glacier named after the associated peak in Whistler, British Columbia
 Spearhead Range, a subrange of the Garibaldi Ranges of the Pacific Ranges of the Coast Mountains in British Columbia

Literature 
 Spearhead (Davis novel), a 1958 novel by Franklin M. Davis, Jr.
 Spearhead (Makos novel), a 2019 novel by Adam Makos
 Spearhead (G.I. Joe), a fictional character in the G.I. Joe universe

Music 
 Spearhead (band), a musical group founded by Michael Franti
 Spearhead (album), an album by British death metal band Bolt Thrower

Politics 
 Melanesian Spearhead Group, a forum of south Pacific island nations
 Spearhead (magazine), a British far-right magazine

Other 
 Spearhead (video game), a 1998 computer game by Zombie Studios
 Chlorocrambe hastata, a species of plant in the family Brassicaceae
 Spearhead, a division of the video game company Electronic Arts
 Senecio tropaeolifolius, a species in the daisy family which is known as "nasturtium-leaf spearhead"